The Battle of Tskhinvali was a battle for the city of Tskhinvali, capital of the breakaway state of South Ossetia. It was the only major battle in the Russo-Georgian War. Georgian ground troops entered the city on early 8 August 2008, after an artillery assault. Georgians took control of most of the city in hours. Russian main forces began entering South Ossetia through the Roki tunnel. After being initially forced to withdraw, the Georgian troops made several attempts to retake the city. Due to the difficult logistics of the terrain, the arrival of Russian reinforcements was slow. After fierce fighting, Georgian troops were finally forced to withdraw from the city on the evening of 10 August. On 11 August, all Georgian troops left South Ossetia. Parts of Tskhinvali were devastated in the three-day fighting.

Background

Before the Battle
On the night of August 2, as a result of an exchange of fire on both sides - Georgian and South Ossetian - more than 20 people were injured, six people died.

Within three days from Russia arrived 300 volunteers from North Ossetia arrived in South Ossetia, while mobilization of up to 2000 “volunteers” and Cossacks began in the North Caucasus. The number of regular Russian troops in the region was increasing.

On 7 August 2008, the Georgian authorities received foreign intelligence reports about movement of Russian troops towards the Roki tunnel.  Russian troops had illicitly crossed the Russo-Georgian state border and advanced into  South Ossetia  by 7 August, before the Georgian military response. According to Der Spiegel, the Georgian tanks were to advance to the Roki Tunnel to seal it off.  

The Georgian forces deployed on the South Ossetian border on 7 August included the 2nd, 3rd and 4th Infantry Brigades, the Artillery Brigade, elements of the 1st Infantry Brigade, and the separate Gori Tank Battalion, plus special forces and Ministry of the Internal Affairs troops  – as many as 16,000 men, according to Moscow Defense Brief. International Institute for Strategic Studies and Western intelligence quoted by Der Spiegel give a lower estimate, saying that the Georgians had amassed by 7 August about 12,000 troops near South Ossetian administrative line and 75 tanks and armored personnel carriers near Gori.

On the opposite side at the same time, there were said to be 500 regular Russian soldiers and 500 South Ossetian fighters ready to defend Tskhinvali, according to an estimate quoted by Der Spiegel.

According to the materials that were made available to Independent International Fact-Finding Mission by South Ossetian authorities, the South Ossetian military forces consisted primarily of light rifle battalions with seconded artillery units and obsolete Soviet-made armoured vehicles. The total strength of the separatist military and law enforcement personnel, including reserve units which took part in the combat, was less than 3,500.

According to Konstantin Makienko, founder of the Centre for Analysis of Strategies and Technologies (CAST), the Georgian objective was a rapid destruction of Ossetian armed forces and a capture of Tskhinvali before the Russian army could have a chance to intervene. "It appears that during the night from August 7 to 8. Tbilisi intended to deliver strikes on the positions of the Russian peacekeepers and the South Ossetian army in order to paralyze the chain of command. The next objective was to take Tskhinvali during August 8, install a puppet government chaired by Dmitry Sanakoyev [...], and bring residents of Georgian enclaves in the republic onto the streets during pro-Georgia mass rallies."

Battle

Georgian attack

Artillery preparation

At 23:35 on 7 August, Georgian artillery units began firing smoke shells into South Ossetia. Soon afterwards, at 23.50 Georgian artillery opened fire against fixed and moving enemy targets.
The interval was supposed to allow the civilian population to leave dangerous areas. The equipment used in the artillery assault included 27 rocket launchers, 152-millimetre guns, as well as cluster munitions.

The commander of the Georgian peacekeepers, Mamuka Kurashvili informed the Commander of Joint Peacekeeping Forces, major-general Marat Kulakhmetov, that Georgia began the military operation in South Ossetia. He assured their safety and called for the Russian peacekeepers not to interfere, even though they had orders to shoot on Georgian forces.

Georgian advance

Early on the morning of 8 August, Georgia launched a ground attack, as well as operations on the left and right flanks of Tskhinvali. The left flank operation was undertaken by the 4th Infantry Brigade coming from Vaziani, while the 3rd Infantry Brigade from Kutaisi took to the right flank. The aim of the flank operations was to occupy important heights around Tskhinvali and then, moving further northwards, to take control of the strategically important Gupta bridge and the roads, including the Ossetian-controlled Dzara by-pass road, leading from the Roki tunnel to Tskhinvali. This was done in order to block Russian troops from travelling through the tunnel to Tskhinvali. Georgian forces seized several South Ossetian villages located on higher ground around the city.

The artillery of the 4th Brigade began to shell targets inside Khetagurovo at 00:40. 20 minutes later two of its light infantry battalions began to advance and quickly took the village of Muguti without a fight and then seized the village of Khetagurovo after a battle with an inferior South Ossetian force. Another battalion took several Ossetian border villages of the Znaur District to the west of the city without encountering resistance, while several villages of the Leningor District were quickly occupied without a fight by special forces of the Interior Ministry.

After several hours of bombardment Georgian forces began to advance towards Tskhinvali. South Ossetian forces employed artillery and mortars against Georgian troops massed near the village of Zemo Nikozi, but the bombardment was ineffective. According to South Ossetian sources, a Georgian tank attack on the suburbs of the city was repelled by militia at 3:46 AM. At 4:00 AM, Georgian forces approaching Tskhinvali began engaging South Ossetian regular forces and militia. At first Georgian tanks shelled enemy positions from a safe distance, without entering the city. At dawn a special task-force of the Interior Ministry attempted to take the village of Kvaisa, west of Tskhinvali, but was repelled by a platoon of South Ossetian troops manning fortified positions, losing several wounded. At 6:00 AM, the Georgian 3rd Brigade launched an offensive into the Eredvi region, east of Tskhinvali, seizing villages and strategic vantage points. They soon encountered resistance from a company-sized South Ossetian force, firing from fortified positions at the Prisi Heights.

After the heights near Tskhinvali were secured, Georgian military and police moved into the city. Their assault was supported by artillery and tanks. Georgia says that the entry to Tskhinvali took place at 06:00 AM. The Russian peacekeepers' southern compound, manned by about 250 soldiers, laid in immediate vicinity of the entrance to the town. After Georgian troops approached the compound, an exchange of fire with Russian peacekeepers broke out. Georgian Cobra vehicles opened fire at the base with heavy machine guns. In response the Russians positioned three BMP-1 vehicles at the perimeter of the base. The Georgians then called in tank support and shortly after three T-72s from the Independent Combined Tank Battalion arrived. At 6:30, the tanks opened fire. The first shell destroyed an observation post on the roof of the compound, killing a Russian peacekeeper and a South Ossetian observer who were directing mortar fire against the advancing Georgian infantry. The tanks also shelled the three Russian BMP-1 vehicles stationed in front of the base, killing five of their crews and destroying the IFVs in the process. Among those dead were soldiers from the Russian 135th Motorized Infantry Regiment. During the engagement, one of the Georgian tanks, which was damaged by an RPG-7 rocket, became trapped in an irrigation ditch near the compound and was abandoned by its crew. The other two tanks pulled back and continued shelling the compound from a distance, and were soon joined by artillery and mortars. One Russian T-72B(M) got abandoned and destroyed as a result of shelling next to the Peacekeepers barracks. By 08:00 AM on 8 August, Georgian infantry and tanks had entered Tskhinvali and engaged in a fierce battle with Ossetian militia and the Russian peacekeeping battalion stationed in the city. 1,500 Georgian ground troops had reached the centre of Tskhinvali by 10 AM on 8 August.

According to the Russian side, Georgian troops had captured the Southern Base of the Russian peacekeepers by 11:00 AM and were attempting to take the northern peacekeeper base. Georgian forces then sent in armored units to smash resistance offered by Russian peacekeepers and Ossetian militia. The servicemen stationed at the northern base repelled five Georgian attacks and continued to engage overwhelming Georgian forces. At this point, according to the Russian side, the peacekeepers suffered their first casualties: two servicemen killed and five wounded. Georgia maintains that it only targeted Russian peacekeepers in self-defence, after coming under fire from them. At 12:15 AM on 8 August, the commander of the Russian JPKF peacekeepers, Marat Kulakhmetov, reported to the OSCE monitors that his unit had come under fire and that they had casualties. According to a top Russian military commander, over 10 Russian peacekeepers were killed during fighting in Tskhinvali.

Georgian shelling had left some buildings of Tskhinvali in ruins. According to Der Spiegel, the peacekeepers' cafeteria was completely destroyed, and all of their buildings went up in flames. Russian TV showed damaged houses and apartment buildings in Tskhinvali. According to Ossetian source, Georgian troops burned down the South Ossetian Ministry of Culture and damaged Parliament. A number of apartment block buildings were set ablaze, and the streets were pocketed with numerous bomb craters. A Guardian reporter claimed that while some neighborhoods were intact, "there were patches of terrible destruction".

Russian intervention

Arrival of Russian reinforcements

According to Western intelligence agencies quoted by Der Spiegel, the involvement of Russian regular forces began at 07:30 on 8 August, when Russia launched SS-21 short-range ballistic missiles against military and government bunker positions in the city Borjomi, southwest of Gori. The first Russian air attack was recorded two hours later, at around 09:30, on the village of Shavshvebi in the Gori District.

At 2:00 AM on 8 August, according to CAST, the Russian Army began to arrive in South Ossetia, when battalions from the 693rd and 135th Motorized Rifle Regiments began arriving in South Ossetia through the Roki Tunnel. Individual platoons began securing positions on the road from the Roki Tunnel to Tskhinvali, so as to ensure the safe entry of additional Russian forces into the region.

According to Russia, the Security Council of South Ossetia appealed to Russia at around 11:00 on 8 August, requesting help. According to Moscow Defense Brief, on the morning of 8 August, the Russian government made a decision to conduct an operation to prevent Georgia from seizing the territory of South Ossetia. Russia claimed to have responded to an attack on the peacekeepers and to be defending South Ossetian civilians. Russia claimed that its aim was "peace enforcement". Russia accused Georgia of committing "genocide". Russian authorities claimed that the civilian casualties in Tskhinvali amounted up to 2,000. These high casualty figures were later revised down to 162 casualties as of 23 December 2008.

A captain in the 135th Regiment, Denis Sidristy, said in the interview published by Krasnaya Zvezda that his unit had been ordered to move to Tskhinvali on 7 August. Sidristy said that he witnessed the Georgian attack on Tskhinvali around midnight. According to a senior Russian official, General Uvarov, the first Russian combat unit, the First Battalion of the 135th Motorized Rifle Regiment, was ordered at around dawn of 8 August to move through the Roki Tunnel. According to him, the unit did not pass through the tunnel until 2:30 PM. According to him, it reached Tskhinvali in the next evening, having met heavy resistance from Georgians. Georgia disputed the account, saying that heavy combat with Russian forces had started before dawn of 8 August. According to Der Spiegel, Russian troops did not begin marching through the tunnel until roughly 11 AM on 8 August.

According to the Georgian account, the first Russian units crossed the tunnel at 5:30 on 8 August, passed through Java and proceeded to advance on Tskhinvali, using the Dzara road. The first motorcade of Russian tanks, armored vehicles and ammunition trucks reached Tskhinvali at 18:44 and opened fire on the Georgian forces in the city and surrounding heights. The second motorcade, which also came from Russia via the Roki tunnel, was stopped near the Georgian-controlled area of Dmenisi, 7 kilometers north of Tskhinvali, and the Russians commenced heavy fire on Georgian forces. The Russian artillery fire against Georgian forces in and around Tskhinvali reportedly included Grad bombardament as well causing more collateral damage.

The main Russian ground forces belonged to the 58th Army and were veterans of the Second Chechen War. The 58th Army was reinforced by the 76th Guards Air Assault Division. Cossacks also moved in to combat the Georgians as well.

Air operations in South Ossetia
Russian aircraft started flying missions in the early hours of 8 August and targeted Georgian air defence installations in the Gori district. Aircraft types employed during the war included the Sukhoi Su-24, Sukhoi Su-25, Sukhoi Su-27 and Mikoyan MiG-29. According to Der Spiegel, the Russian air force managed to establish air superiority. However, according to the Centre for Analysis of Strategies and Technologies (CAST), Russia never gained air superiority in the South Ossetian theatre, as the Russian Air Force took early losses (three Su-25s) to Georgian anti-aircraft fire, and was forced to stop making sorties for two days. Citing eyewitness reports, CAST writes that "... there were no Russian aircraft over Tskhinvali on August 8 or the following day — that is, during the most critical period of the conflict. In effect, the Russian military command was forced to bring motor-rifle units into battle from the march, without first gaining superiority in numbers and firepower." Russian aviation only reappeared on 10 August. The Georgian troops had at least one battalion of relatively modern Buk-M1 self-propelled SAM systems, at least two battalions (a total of eight units) of Osa-AK self-propelled SAM systems and six to ten of the upgraded Osa-AKM version. The Georgian army managed to deploy strong air defenses right in the conflict zone.

During the early stages of the battle, the loss of two Russian aircraft, a Sukhoi Su-25 and a Tupolev Tu-22M, was admitted by Anatoliy Nogovitsyn of the Russian General Staff. The fate of their pilots was unknown then. Reuters reported that one Russian pilot was probably taken prisoner. South Ossetia claimed that its soldiers shot down two Georgian aircraft.

The Russian Air Force made around 200 sorties during the war, including missions in Georgia proper. Due to the lack of night-vision equipment, it mostly operated during daytime, while the Georgian Air Force was able to operate at night as well. However the Georgian airforce was rendered immobile one day into the conflict when Russian planes impaired the airstrips. Problems in suppressing Georgian air defences (partly due to lack of training in this role), meant that the Russian air force was initially unable to provide direct support to its own troops. Moscow Defense Brief strongly criticised the performance of the Russian Air Force, saying that there was a total absence of co-operation between the army and air force, and that of the six Russian aircraft lost during the war, of which according to them, half were downed by friendly fire.

Georgian advance is stopped
By the afternoon of 8 August, Georgian forces had captured large parts of Tskhinvali, but had been unable to take the Northern quarter and a part of the city centre. However, the Georgians were meeting heavy resistance from the opposite side, including from Russian air force and artillery. At around 2:00 PM, a Georgian T-72 tank with its entire crew was destroyed by General Barankevich. Several minutes later on the same street, the South Ossetian militia hit another two Georgian T-72 tanks. Almost simultaneously with the destruction of the three Georgian tanks, a pair of two Russian Su-25 aircraft raided the Georgian positions in the western outskirts of Tskhinvali, killing more than 20 Georgian soldiers. The Georgian battalion fled in panic and left behind its dead and much of the equipment, including at least three T-72 tanks.

Georgian flank operations were unsuccessful in their goal of blocking the Gupta Bridge and the main routes leading to Tskhinvali from the Roki Tunnel and Java base. A Georgian air attack against the Gupta bridge reportedly damaged it, but the bridge was quickly repaired. Russian special units reportedly prevented Georgian saboteurs from blowing up the Roki Tunnel, which could have hindered the Russian military operations, as the capacity of the other roads was not sufficient.

Fighting between Georgian and Russian forces

Later on 8 August, according to Moscow Defense Brief, three tactical battalion groups from the 135th, 503rd and 693rd Motorized Rifle Regiments of the 19th Motorized Rifle Division (based in Vladikavkaz) of the 58th Army of the North Caucasus Military District were deployed in battle formation to Java and Gufta and by the end of the day had pushed Georgian forces from the roads and heights around Dzari, Kverneti and Tbeti areas and as far as the western edge of Tskhinvali.

Experiencing growing resistance, the Georgian forces withdrew from the centre of Tshkinvali but still held their positions in the southern parts of the town. They were regrouped and reinforced by the 2nd Infantry Brigade from Senaki. Reportedly, the 4th Brigade reinforced the Ministry of Interior special troops in Tshkinvali, while positions and objectives of the 4th Brigade on the left flank were transferred to the 2nd Brigade. During the evening of 8 August, vicious fighting reportedly took place in the area of Tskhinvali.

Official military casualties, as reported on 8 August, were claimed to be 30 Georgians and Moscow claimed 21 Russian soldiers had lost their lives so far. Russian media reported that exchanges of fire between Russian and Georgian troops continued throughout the night.

The passage of Russian forces through the narrow Roki Tunnel and along the mountain roads was slow and the Russians had difficulties in concentrating their troops, forcing them to bring their forces into battle battalion by battalion. In the afternoon of 9 August, the regrouped Georgian troops tried to regain their control of position in Tskhinvali. The Georgians launched several attacks, including some with tanks. The assault was met with resistance and the Georgians suffered losses, forcing them to withdraw. Because of the gradual increase in troops, the amassed Russian forces in South Ossetia outnumbered the Georgians by nearly two to one on 9 August. In total, the Russians moved between 5,500 and 10,000 troops to South Ossetia through the Roki Tunnel, according to Der Spiegel.

The ambush
On 9 August, a 30 vehicles strong convoy led by Russia's 58th Army commander Lieutenant General Anatoly Khrulyov moved into Tskhinvali from the Roki Tunnel and got shelled by artillery and tanks near the entrance of the town. When pushing further they were encircled and ambushed by special forces. Simultaneously a mixed force of police and military had regrouped at Zemo Nikosi and were launching another assault into Tskhinvali. The effort was supported by the 2nd Infantry Brigade which was held in reserve. While the main offensive failed due to counterattacks and air raids which took out communication, the Georgian special forces proceeded in systematically decimating the trapped Russian convoy. They were subsequently supported by some of the infantry and police elements moving into the area. The Russian side speculates that the general's capture was a primary goal of the Georgians however they have made no such claim. The Georgian attack was opportunistic. General Khrulyov was already carried from the battlefield when he got wounded in his vehicle by the earlier shelling. Two Russian journalists that accompanied the unit and witnessed the spectacle were wounded in the ensuing firefight and evacuated as well. A Russian major named Denis Vetchinov took command over the remaining forces and created a defense perimeter. Vetchinov is credited with killing a Georgian soldier or special police officer with a captured machine gun while being wounded in both legs. Later, he was hit in the head while providing suppressive fire and died en route to hospital. Vetchinov was awarded the title Hero of the Russian Federation posthumously. The trapped Russian units avoided complete destruction by splitting into smaller platoons and scattering, however reportedly 25 out of 30 vehicles of that vanguard force were destroyed.

Turning point and Georgian withdrawal

The Georgian troops maintained the tactical initiative on the outskirts of Tskhinvali throughout 9 August and even during 10 August. By the morning of 10 August, the Georgians had captured almost the whole of Tskhinvali, forcing the Ossetian forces and Russian peacekeeping battalion to retreat to the northern reaches of the city. However, Moscow Defense Brief writes: ... on this very day the accumulation of Russian forces in the region finally bore fruit, and the fighting in South Ossetia reached a turning point. Toward the evening of August 10, Tskhinvali was completely cleared of Georgian forces, which retreated to the south of the city. Georgian forces were also repelled from the key Prisi heights. The bulk of Georgia’s artillery was defeated. Meanwhile, Ossetian forces, with the support of Russian divisions, took Tamarasheni, Kekhvi, Kurta, and Achabeti on the approach to Tskhinvali from the north. Georgian forces in several of Georgian enclaves were eliminated. According to Moscow Defense Brief, Georgian artillery continued shelling Tskhinvali. South Ossetian government representative claimed that Georgian troops opened the irrigation canal to flood basements and prevent civilians from seeking shelter.

The then Georgian president Mikheil Saakashvili ordered a general ceasefire on August 10 effectively halting all Georgian military operations while the Russian forces continued moving against any opposition. By the end of 11 August South Ossetia was completely cleared of Georgian forces. During the withdrawal, the Georgian 4th Mechanised Infantry Brigade was bombarded by Russian aircraft and the unit suffered heavy casualties. Small isolated Georgian units continued resistance. The Russian advance was briefly halted near the villages of Zemo-Nikozi and Shindisi, with the Russians losing a T-72B with its entire crew and a BMD-2 in fighting with retreating Georgian infantry elements, but continued after Chechen units cleared Zemo-Nikosi. A controversial engagement took place in the village of Shindisi which was being occupied by Russian forces when a Georgian Sapper convoy of the 2nd Light Infantry Brigade was allowed to pass the village as major engagements ceased at that point. The lightly armed unit was transported with Landrovers and trucks. In what is being described as either confusion or by the Georgian side a calculated move, the Engineer group got surrounded and attacked as soon as it reached an abandoned railway station. All vehicles were destroyed and 17 Georgian soldiers killed during the fight, while 5 servicemen partially wounded managed to escape and were sheltered and nursed by the local residents who hid them from the Russian army. According to Russian accounts, the convoy was attacked when it passed a Russian mechanised unit and the Russian soldiers reacted by attacking it. Later that day the local Georgian priests requested to retrieve the dead soldiers bodies which was initially denied but shortly after allowed by the Russian commander in charge.

According to the Russian CAST, what stopped the Georgian advance in the end was not the Russian Air Force, but the resistance offered by peacekeepers and lightly armed, poorly organized South Ossetian units located in Tskhinvali. The Georgian troops failed to take Tskhinvali because they were not prepared psychologically for severe urban warfare. According to Georgian officials as well as Georgian military claims Russian air sorties effectively undermined all major military efforts by destroying most communication assets and targeting crucial rally points. The Georgian army also suffered its heaviest casualties during the withdrawal by Russian air attacks.

The Georgian Defence Minister later acknowledged, that the Georgian military tried to push into Tskhinvali three times in all. During the last attempt, they got a very heavy counterattack which Georgian officers described as "something like hell." In total, the fighting in the Tskhinvali area lasted for three days and nights. An estimated 10,000–11,000 soldiers took part in the general Georgian offensive in South Ossetia. Of those over 40 were killed in combat mainly in and around Tskhinvali while more than 120 fell to air attacks, ambushes and artillery bombardment, mostly during the retreat. Hundreds were wounded and dozens captured. The fighting throughout South Ossetia lasted for four days.

Having retreated from South Ossetia, the Georgian forces regrouped at Gori. Associated Press reported that a Russian Army Colonel said he had orders not to move his troops deeper into Georgia. "We are staying here," he claimed.

Aftermath and assessments

 
Human Rights Watch reported that the Georgian forces used Grad rockets, self-propelled artillery, mortars, and howitzers during the attack. The South Ossetian parliament building along with several schools and nurseries were used as defence positions or operational posts by South Ossetian forces and volunteer militias. Georgian artillery fire targeted and hit these buildings. In many of the shelled villages, Ossetian militia positions were in close proximity to civilian houses. Georgia said that the attacks only intended to "neutralize firing positions from where Georgian positions were being targeted." HRW documented the witnesses stating that civilian objects were used by South Ossetian forces, thus rendering them legitimate military targets. HRW concluded that South Ossetian forces were responsible for endangering civilians by setting up defensive positions in close vicinity of or directly inside civilian structures. Georgia was also responsible for the indiscriminate nature of its attacks and insufficient focus on minimizing risk to civilians. According to South Ossetian and Russian media reports, the Russian forces also shelled Tskhinvali with Grad rocket launchers.

Tskhinvali Hospital's doctor, interviewed by Human Rights Watch, spoke of 273 wounded, both military and civilians, and 44 dead bodies being brought to the hospital, supposedly the majority of people killed in the city. Patients had to be moved into the basement during the fighting and the hospital itself was damaged by a rocket.

Several journalists were reported to be among the casualties, including the two, who were embedded with the ambushed Russian armoured column, in which General Khrulyov was wounded.

References

Further reading

External links

Pictures from Human Rights Watch

Russo-Georgian War
Conflicts in 2008
Battles involving Georgia (country)
Battles involving Russia
Battles post-1945
Urban warfare
Tskhinvali
Operations involving Georgian special forces
August 2008 events in Asia